The 48th Division was created in February 1949 under the Regulation of the Redesignations of All Organizations and Units of the Army, issued by Central Military Commission on November 1, 1948, basing on the 3rd Independent Brigade of Yuwansu Military District. 

The division is part of 16th Corps. Under the flag of 48th division it took part in the Chinese civil war. On March 13, 1952, the division was disbanded.

As of its disbandment the division was composed of:
142nd Regiment;
143rd Regiment;
144th Regiment.

References

中国人民解放军各步兵师沿革，http://blog.sina.com.cn/s/blog_a3f74a990101cp1q.html

Infantry divisions of the People's Liberation Army
Military units and formations established in 1949
Military units and formations disestablished in 1952